Jamiat Ulema-e-Pakistan (JUP) is a Islamist political party in Pakistan. It was founded in 1948 by leaders of All India Sunni Conference. JUP exercised considerable political influence in Pakistani politics during 1970s to 2003. Its students' wing Anjuman Talaba-e-Islam has a considerable following in Sunni institutions across the country. The Party is considered a moderate force in the country.

History
It was established on 28 March 1948 in Multan, Pakistan by the leaders of All India Sunni Conference to present Sunni Sufi representation in Islamic Republic of Pakistan.It had major support base in Sindh and Punjab.

JUP supported Ayub Khan's regime during the 1965 presidential elections on the promises of getting a Shariah-based Pakistan.

In the 1970 elections, the JUP got the seven seats in Sindh  under the leadership of Maulana Ahmad Shah Noorani but it did not join General Zia' Ul Haq government due to Salafi-Saudi inclination of Zia regime.The party was opposed to Zia's military rule, due to two reasons. First it had pro-democracy stand and second because of Zia's support of Deobandi-Wahhabi Islam promoted by Saudi Arabia. Being a Sufi-Sunni party and its clear stand against Wahabism, JUP could not expect to receive Arab money which was being given to Deobandi-Wahabi parties in Pakistan.

Ideology
JUP was established  for the implementation of the Quran and Sunnah in the newly formed Islamic Republic of Pakistan. 
The party advocated the establishment of Islamic system of Prophet's Sunnah (Nizam-e-Mustafa) Shariat Courts and passing of law of blasphemy and played a role in declaring Qadiyanis as non Muslims. In 1974 a bill was passed in the parliament to declare Qadiyanis as non Muslims through the efforts of JUP President Shah Ahmad Noorani.  
JUP through its leaders inserted the definition of Muslim and argued that the Finality of Prophet-hood to be included in this definition.

It opposed to the US-led attack in Afghanistan after 9/11 but supported combating the Taliban and hardcore extremist ideologies in the SWAT region of Pakistan.

Present
The party was mostly active from 1970s to 2003 as independent political party and having a role in mainstream politics and significance as well. 
Clashes over party decisions have divided the JUP into factions, and since 1986 the JUP has lost much of its support. The two main factions are headed by Shah Ahmad Noorani and Abdus Sattar Niazi. After the death of Noorani, one  faction is led by Shah Owais Noorani, son of former president late Shah Ahmed Noorani, and the other by Sahibzada Abul Khair Muhammad Zubair, a former MNA of Hyderabad.

On 20 September 2020, JUP founded Pakistan Democratic Movement along with ten other parties. On 20 September 2020, JAH's Ameer Sajid Mir attended the All Parties Conference (APC). At the APC, eleven parties started the Pakistan Democratic Movement (PDM) which was made to remove military establishment of Pakistan from politics. JUP also came for PDM's public gatherings and power-shows.

References

 
Islamic political parties in Pakistan
Sunni Islamic political parties
Barelvi political parties
Political parties established in 1948
Muttahida Majlis-e-Amal